The Ghabbour Group is an Egyptian manufacturer of automobiles, buses, trucks and motorcycles located in Cairo.

The company was founded in 1960 by the brothers Kamal and Sadek Ghabbour because they realized that the automotive sector was a growing market. In its early days the company was named Ghabbour Brothers. Formerly, the group was manufactured Saviem (later RVI) vehicles. Today the Group manufactures vehicles for numerous brands such as: Bajaj Auto, Hyundai and Volvo. With an annual output of 150,000 units, the Ghabbour Group is currently the largest automobile manufacturer in Egypt.

Model overview

Fuso
Mitsubishi Canter
Mitsubishi Cruiser
Mitsubishi Eagle
Mitsubishi FP
Mitsubishi FV
Mitsubishi Rosa

Hyundai
Hyundai Accent
Hyundai Accent Sport
Hyundai Solaris
Hyundai Atos Prime
Hyundai Elantra AD & MD & HD
Hyundai Elantra SE
Hyundai H-1
Hyundai H-1 Van
Hyundai H100 Pick-up
Hyundai i30
Hyundai i30 CW
Hyundai Matrix
Hyundai Nova
Hyundai Santa Fe
Hyundai Sonata
Hyundai Tucson ix35
Hyundai Verna
Hyundai Verna Star
Hyundai Verna Viva

Mazda vehicles
Mazda 6 sedan
Mazda 3 sedan & hatchback
Mazda 2 sedan
Mazda CX-9

Chinese vehicles
Its Geely Emgrand brand faced a lot of criticism at one point for endangering people's lives. The campaign generated a lot of negative sentiment towards the brand.

Geely Emgrand
Chery Envy
Chery Tiggo

Bajaj Auto
motorbikes
auto rickshaws

Volvo Trucks
Volvo FH
Volvo FL6
Volvo FM
Volvo Splendido (B12B Bus Type GVW)

References

External links 
Ghabbour Group website
Hyundai in Egypt
Mitsubishi Fuso (Dealer list)
Volvo Trucks in Egypt
Volvo Construction Equipment in Egypt
Ghabbour Group on the Egyptian Stick Exchange

Vehicle manufacturing companies established in 1960
Car manufacturers of Egypt
Motorcycle manufacturers of Egypt
Bus manufacturers of Egypt
Manufacturing companies based in Cairo
Truck manufacturers of Egypt
Egyptian companies established in 1960
Conglomerate companies of Egypt